Surveillance Oz: Dash Cam is an Australian factual television series and take a look into the shocking accidents and road rage incidents caught on camera across the roads of Australia. Screened on the Seven Network that premiered on 21 May 2015 with a double episode, before returning in November 2015 with 4 more episodes. A second season began screening in October 2017 and the season contained 6 episodes.

About 
Take a look into the shocking accidents and road rage incidents caught on camera across the roads of Australia.

Series overview

Episodes

Series 1 (2015)

Series 2 (2017)

Series 3 (2021) 

It was confirmed by Seven Studios that a 3rd series has been produced.

References

Australian factual television series
Seven Network original programming
2015 Australian television series debuts
2010s Australian reality television series
2020s Australian reality television series
Television series by Seven Productions